The 2013 general election in the Autonomous Region in Muslim Mindanao (ARMM) were held on May 13, 2013. Originally scheduled for October 2011, this was the first ARMM election that was synchronized with the general elections in the Philippines; previously, ARMM elections were held outside the general election day. When the elected officials of the 2008 ARMM elections ended their terms in 2011, President Benigno Aquino III appointed officers-in-charge until the officials elected in 2013 can take their place.

The governor and vice governor are elected via first past the post system; they are elected separately and may come from different parties. Elections for the regional assembly are via plurality-at-large voting, with each assembly district (coextensive with legislative districts as used in House of Representatives elections) having three seats. A voter has can vote for up to the three candidates, with the candidates with the three highest total number of votes being elected.

Results

Regional governor

Regional vice governor

Regional assembly
These figures came from the COMELEC "Transparency" server and are therefore partial and unofficial.

References

2013 elections in the Philippines
2013